Caravanserai – is a historical monument in Sheki, a part of which is used as a hotel.

Historical information
Swift development of trade in the Middle Ages enhanced importance of caravanserai existing in the territory of Azerbaijan at that time and favored construction of new ones. Generally caravanserai were built in form of castles with one gate, closing of which made them impregnable during dangerous incidents. 

“Caravanserai” historical complex in Sheki is two magnificent caravanserai which reached present days and traditionally named “Yukhary” and “Ashaghy” caravanserai, which means “Upper” and “Lower” Caravanserai in translation from Azerbaijani into English. Construction of these caravanserai is dated back to the 18th-19th centuries AD.

Lower caravanserai

“Lower” caravanserai has a rectangular shape with a large inner yard in the centre of which is located a pool. Total area of the caravanserai is 8000 m2 and dimensions are 55x85 meters. Four entries led to the yard from all four corners of the buildings. There are 242 rooms in the lower caravanserai. Earlier there were merchant stores and storage rooms in the coaching inn, but the first floor was intended for guests whom the rooms were leased. Each room had a manhole which was connected to the ground floor with a stepladder and it was very comfortable for merchants who wanted control the safety of their products at any time. 

Since 1988, the lower caravanserai is used as a hotel complex for tourists, guests of the city and local residents. There is a restaurant of national cuisine with 100 places functioning in the territory of the complex.  There are luxury suits in compliance with international standards in the hotel.

Upper caravanserai

“Upper” caravanserai is located in more complex relief (The fleeting Gurjan River runs near the caravanserai) and is  trapezium-shaped. Total area of the building is 6000 m2. Frontal part of the building overlooking the street has a height of 14 meters, but the inner part 8 meters. There are about 300 rooms and store rooms in the upper part of the caravanserai. Unlike the lower caravanserai, the upper caravanserai isn't used as a hotel. It attracts tourists as a historical and architectural monument and local sightseeing.

References

External links 
 Detailed recordings from the caravanserai

Caravanserais in Azerbaijan
19th-century establishments in Azerbaijan
Silk Road
Monuments and memorials in Azerbaijan
Tourist attractions in Azerbaijan
Hotels in Azerbaijan